Eagle is a 1990 Croatian film directed by Zoran Tadić. It is based on Umjetni orao, a novel by Pavao Pavličić.

Plot summary
Radovan Orlak, known to his friends as Orao (Eagle), fell to his death off a high-rise building on his birthday. Upon hearing the news, four of his long-time friends - Milan, Dražen, Krešo and Vlado - realize how little they actually knew about him and begin to investigate in the hopes of uncovering what really happened. They assume their friend has committed suicide, and begin to exact revenge on people whom they deem responsible. After a while, they find out that Orao was seen with an unidentified man on the night of his death, and begin to suspect he was actually murdered...

Release and reception
Shortly after the film was completed, Marjan Film went bankrupt, which was followed by the outbreak of Yugoslav Wars. As a result, the film was never distributed theatrically.

While Croatian Film Association's database assessed Eagle as Tadić's weakest film to date, Croatian film critic Nenad Polimac listed it in his 2007 selection of "lost classics" of Croatian cinema.

References

External links

1990 films
1990s Croatian-language films
Films based on Croatian novels
Films set in Zagreb
Croatian drama films
1990 drama films
Yugoslav drama films